Jesse White may refer to:

 Jesco White, the West Virginia "Dancing Outlaw"
 Jesse J. White, former member of the Pennsylvania House of Representatives
 Jesse White (actor), (1917-1997) film and television actor
 Jesse White, American professional wrestler also known as Jake Carter (wrestler)
 Jesse White (footballer) (born 1988), Australian rules footballer
 Jesse White (politician) (born 1934), Illinois politician

See also 
 Jessica White, American female supermodel
 Jessie White, British female writer who resided in Italy